Bruno Alexandre Marques Pereirinha (born 2 March 1988) is a former Portuguese footballer. He played mainly as a right midfielder, also being able to operate as an attacking right-back.

He spent most of his professional career with Sporting CP, appearing in 143 official matches over five seasons (five goals scored) and winning three major titles, including two Portuguese Cups. Abroad, he had spells at Lazio in Italy and Atlético Paranaense of Brazil.

All youth levels comprised, Pereirinha won 53 caps for Portugal, including 23 for the under-21s.

Club career

Sporting CP
Born in Rio de Mouro, Lisbon District, Pereirinha made his professional debut for Sporting CP in 2006–07, having started that same season on loan at Segunda Liga team C.D. Olivais e Moscavide, as Miguel Veloso before him. His first appearance for the main squad came on 13 January 2007, playing 18 minutes of a 0–0 away draw with C.F. Os Belenenses, the club where he spent most of his youth career.

On 13 March 2008, in the campaign's UEFA Cup round-of-16 second leg against Bolton Wanderers, Pereirinha scored an 85th-minute goal that gave Sporting a 1–0 home victory and a spot in the quarter-finals. He had also netted in the previous round, to help beat hosts FC Basel 3–0.

Pereirinha continued to be regularly used the following years, but almost exclusively from the bench. On 21 March 2009, in a rare start, he opened the score against Lisbon neighbours S.L. Benfica in the final of the Taça da Liga, but the Lions eventually lost on penalties after 1–1 in regulation time.

On 22 June 2010, being deemed surplus to requirements at Sporting, the 22-year-old Pereirinha was loaned to fellow Primeira Liga side Vitória de Guimarães, initially in a season-long move. In early January 2011, however, he joined Kavala F.C. of the Super League Greece also on loan.

Lazio
In 2012–13, Pereirinha was completely ostracised by all four Sporting managers – as several other Portuguese players – also being demoted to the B team in division two and dealing with a right knee injury. Subsequently, he cut ties with the club and signed shortly after with S.S. Lazio in Italy, for three and a half years.

Pereirinha left the Romans on 15 July 2015, after buying out his contract.

Atlético Paranaense
On 15 July 2015, Pereirinha signed a two-year deal with Club Athletico Paranaense. He made his debut ten days later, as a 76th-minute substitute for Eduardo in a 2–1 Série A win at Avaí FC. On 15 October, after only one minute on the pitch, he scored his first goal for his new team to put them back ahead in an eventual 2–2 draw against Cruzeiro Esporte Clube at the Arena da Baixada.

Return to Portugal
In July 2017, Pereirinha returned to his country's top flight with a one-year contract at C.F. Os Belenenses, managed by Domingos Paciência, his last boss at Sporting. He played about half of their league games, split equally as a starter and substitute, and was sent off in the first half of the last one, a 1–0 loss at Boavista FC.

Having started the 2018–19 season without a club, Pereirinha was signed in September by C.D. Cova da Piedade of the second tier.

International career
In 2007, aged 19, Pereirinha broke into the Portugal under-21 side, also representing the nation in the 2007 FIFA U-20 World Cup held in Canada. On 25 March 2009 he, alongside teammate Rui Pedro, was suspended by under-21 coach Carlos Queiroz after both attempted an unsuccessful backpass penalty during a match against Cape Verde for the Madeira International Tournament (the score was then at 2–0 for the hosts).

Personal life
Pererinha's father, Joaquim, was also a footballer. A defender, he represented among others Benfica and S.C. Farense.

Club statistics

Honours
Sporting CP
Taça de Portugal: 2006–07, 2007–08
Supertaça Cândido de Oliveira: 2008
Taça da Liga runner-up: 2007–08, 2008–09

Lazio
Coppa Italia runner-up: 2014–15

Atlético Paranaense
Campeonato Paranaense: 2016

References

External links

1988 births
Living people
People from Sintra
Sportspeople from Lisbon District
Portuguese footballers
Association football midfielders
Association football utility players
Primeira Liga players
Liga Portugal 2 players
Sporting CP footballers
C.D. Olivais e Moscavide players
Vitória S.C. players
Sporting CP B players
C.F. Os Belenenses players
C.D. Cova da Piedade players
Super League Greece players
Kavala F.C. players
Serie A players
S.S. Lazio players
Campeonato Brasileiro Série A players
Club Athletico Paranaense players
Portugal youth international footballers
Portugal under-21 international footballers
Portuguese expatriate footballers
Expatriate footballers in Greece
Expatriate footballers in Italy
Expatriate footballers in Brazil
Portuguese expatriate sportspeople in Greece
Portuguese expatriate sportspeople in Italy
Portuguese expatriate sportspeople in Brazil